Moldovans in Ukraine (Romanian: Românii Basarabeni din Ucraina) are the third biggest minority recorded in the 2001 All Ukrainian Census after Russians and Belarusians. Unlike many other minorities, Moldovans often live in the countryside (71.5%) rather than in a city (28.5%), the majority in the northern and southern historical region of Bessarabia.

Moldavian is used to express both politicized census category (Catalans and Valencians, Wends and Slovenes or Rusyns and Ukrainians) and regional identity (Bavarian, Schwabian, Texians) of inhabitans of historical Principality of Moldavia, currently divided among Romania (47.5%), Moldova (30.5%) and Ukraine (22%).  

Because of the Soviet policies of artificial division of the Romanian speakers, that inhabited the territories occupied by the Soviet Union during the Second World War, and the continuation of those practices by the Ukrainian authorities there is an undergoing identity controversy among the Romanophones of Ukraine. All of those living in the former territories of Bukovina, consider themselves to be Romanians, but among those living in the historical lands of Bessarabia, there is still division as a large part of them still consider themselves to be Moldovans, while many others identify as Romanians. This problem  is considered to have worsened due to the poverty, the lack of proper education and the decades long disinformation of the inhabitants.

History

After 1812, Russian Empire annexed Bessarabia from Moldavia. Initially, Romanians under Russian rule enjoyed privileges well, the language of Moldavians was established as an official language in the governmental institutions of Bessarabia, used along with Russian, as more than 90% of the population was Romanian. The publishing works established by Archbishop Gavril Bănulescu-Bodoni were able to produce books and liturgical works in Moldavian dialect of Romanian between 1815 and 1820, used both in Principality of Moldova and in Bessarabia . 

From 1829 to 1905, the Russification policies were implemented and all public use of Romanian was phased out, being substituted with Russian. Romanian continued to be used as the colloquial language of home and family, mostly spoken by Romanians, either first or second language. Many Romanians changed Russified family names. This was the era of the highest level of assimilation in the Russian Empire.

In 1918, Bessarabia united with the Kingdom of Romania.  

In 1940, Bessarabia was annexed by the Soviet Union. Around 65% of Bessarabia is part of the modern-day Moldova, with the Ukrainian Budjak region (part of the Odessa Oblast) covering the southern coastal region, and part of the Ukrainian Chernivtsi Oblast (Romanian: Cernăuți) covering an area in the north. 

Romanian population is scarcely present in other areas of Ukraine. 

Ukraine and Russian'-controlled Transnistria continues to use term Moldovan language, two remaining vestiges of the Soviet-policy of denationalization of Romanians, despite Ukrainian Ministry of Foreign Affairs not recognizing distinction between Romanian and Moldovan

Demographics
The number of Moldovans was 258,619 in 2001, out of which 181,124 declared Moldovan, and 2,790 declared Romanian, as their native language. (the 2001 Ukrainian Census). The people identifying themselves as Moldovans were a majority in Novoselytsia Raion (Chernivtsi Oblast) and Reni Raion (Odessa Oblast) before the 2020 administrative reform of Ukraine. The number of Romanians, at the same 2001 Census, was 150,989. In Novoselytsia Raion, there were 87,461 inhabitants, of which 50,329 were Moldovans (out of which 47,585 self-identified their language as Moldovan and 2,264 as Romanian), 29,703 Ukrainians, 5,904 Romanians, 1,235 Russians, and 290 others.

Notable representatives
 Sophia Rotaru
 Tatiana Gutsu
 Vasyl Tsushko

See also 

Moldova–Ukraine relations
Ukrainians in Mldova
Romanians in Ukraine
Moldovan diaspora
 New Serbia, a province in the Russian Empire where colonists from Moldavia were the majority
 Slavo-Serbia, another province of the Russian Empire that had a notable minority of colonists from Moldavia
 Budjak
 Northern Bessarabia

References

Ukraine
Ethnic groups in Ukraine